Kamakhya Prasad Tasa is an Indian politician. He is currently Member of parliament in Rajya Sabha since 14 June 2019. He was member of parliament to the 16th Lok Sabha from Jorhat (Lok Sabha constituency), Assam. He won the 2014 Indian general election being a Bharatiya Janata Party candidate. He served as the State Vice President of the Bharatiya Janata Party (BJP) in Assam, India from the year 2013 to 2017. He was born on 15 October 1975.

Kamakhya Prasad Tasa is seen as a formidable leader with a strong and substantial following base. He is credited with BJP's growing influence in various caste groups who have settled in Assam over the state, having arrived in the quest of jobs in the state's tea gardens to mention specifically. His role as a party leader is pivotal for the success of Bharatiya Janata Party (BJP) in the whole North-Eastern Part of India along with the convener of North-East Democratic Alliance (NEDA) Dr. Himanta Biswa Sarma who is the current Chief Minister of Assam.

Early life 
Kamakhya Prasad Tasa belonging to the hard working community of Tea Tribes of Assam was born to Late Dewaram Tasa in Hattigarh Tea Estate, Jorhat, Assam. His talents and leadership quality was notable in the community since his childhood days. He always dreamt high and worked to achieve a dignified position capable to address the miseries of the people of his community, working as tea garden workers. He is one of the earliest achievers in the field of education to obtain a master's degree in his community. He received M A degree in Political Science from J B College in Jorhat, Assam under Dibrugarh University.

Political career 
Kamakhya Prasad Tasa came into the limelight in the arena of national politics in India when he was elected as Member of Parliament (MP) in the 16th Lok Sabha elections from Jorhat constituency in Assam. He has held as member of various committees during his tenure at Lok Sabha from 2014 to 2019. He was a member of the Standing Committee on Petroleum and Natural Gas from 1 September 2014 to 31 August 2017. He has been serving as a member of Consultative Committee, Ministry of Development of North Eastern Region (DoNER) and Committee on Private Members Bills and Resolutions since 15 September 2014 till the dissolution of the 16th Lok Sabha term. He was also a member of Standing Committee on Rural Development formed on 1 September 2017. On 8 February 2017 he became a member of the National Jute Board.

Kamakhya Prasad Tasa was elected unopposed in June 2019 to Rajya Sabha from Assam. The seat fell vacant with the expiry of term of the former Prime Minister of India, Dr Manmohan Singh. Dr. Singh has been representing Assam at Rajya Sabha for five consecutive terms since 1991.

Kamakhya Prasad Tasa's political career as a leader started at the very early age of 16 years, when he was represented as Secretary of Assam Tea Tribes Students’ Association, Jorhat Branch in 1991. He served as the Secretary of this students’ association for five long years till 1995. In the same year of 1995, he was elevated to the position of General Secretary of the central body of Assam Tea Tribes Students’ Association (ATTSU). He served as the General Secretary of the central body of the students’ wing for two terms of 8 years consolidated from 1995 to 2000 and 2000 to 2003.

Tasa has also held various positions in addition to the positions mentioned above. He was a forefront member of J B College, Jorhat Political Science Study Circle for the term of 1993–1994. He was a Court Member of Dibugarh University in 1997–1998. He also turned to be the Convenor to the Tea Community Sub-Committee of the Assam Sahitya Sabha and Executive Member of the Assam Sahitya Sabha for the term of 1998 to 2000. He was an executive member of the Chah Jaangusthi Kala Sanskriti  Council under Sankardev Kalakhetra Samaj.

In the arena of national party politics, Kamakhya Prasad Tasa served as the Vice President of BJP Assam Pradesh from 2013 till the year 2017. Before that he served as the convenor of the Tea Tribes Cell of Bharatiya Janata Party, Assam Pradesh for two consecutive terms from 2005 to 2007 and 2007 to 2010. He was also a Member of the State Election Committee of Bharatiya Party for the years 2000 to 2002.

Positions held 

 Member of Parliament, Lok Sabha 
Constituency - Jorhat (Assam, India)
Term - 2014-2019
 Parliamentary Standing Committee
Joint Committee on Bill to amend the Citizenship Act - 1955
Rural Development 
Member, Standing Committee on Petroleum and Natural Gas (1 Sep. 2014 - 31 Aug. 2017)
 Member of Parliament, Rajya Sabha
Term: 2019-2025

References

India MPs 2014–2019
Living people
Lok Sabha members from Assam
1975 births
People from Jorhat district
Bharatiya Janata Party politicians from Assam